Archie Shepp Live in San Francisco is a live album by Archie Shepp released on Impulse! Records in 1966. The album contains a performance recorded by Shepp, trombonist Roswell Rudd, bassists Donald Garrett and Lewis Worrell and drummer Beaver Harris at the now defunct Both/And Club in San Francisco, CA, on February 19, 1966. The CD edition also contains an extended track that was released on LP as Three for a Quarter, One for a Dime in 1969.

Reception
The AllMusic review by Scott Yanow states that "This Impulse recording features the fiery tenor Archie Shepp with his regularly working group of the period, a quintet also featuring trombonist Roswell Rudd, drummer Beaver Harris and both Donald Garrett and Lewis Worrell on basses. Although two pieces (Shepp's workout on piano on the ballad 'Sylvia' and his recitation on 'The Wedding') are departures, the quintet sounds particularly strong on Herbie Nichols' 'The Lady Sings the Blues' and 'Wherever June Bugs Go' while Shepp's ballad statement on 'In a Sentimental Mood' is both reverential and eccentric".

Track listing 
 "Keep Your Heart Right" (Roswell Rudd) – 1:15
 "Lady Sings the Blues" (Herbie Nichols) – 7:32
 "Sylvia" (Oley Speaks) – 5:35
 "The Wedding" – 2:52
 "Wherever June Bugs Go" – 10:25
 "In a Sentimental Mood" (Duke Ellington, Manny Kurtz, Irving Mills) – 6:14
 "Things Ain't What They Used to Be" (Mercer Ellington, Ted Persons) – 7:56 Bonus track on CD
 "Three for a Quarter, One for a Dime" – 32:54  Bonus track on CD
All compositions by Archie Shepp except as indicated
 Recorded at the Both/And Club in San Francisco, CA, on February 19, 1966

Personnel 
 Archie Shepp – tenor saxophone, piano, recitation
 Roswell Rudd – trombone
 Donald Garrett – bass
 Lewis Worrell – bass
 Beaver Harris – drums

References 

1966 live albums
Archie Shepp live albums
Albums produced by Bob Thiele
Impulse! Records live albums